Khazl (also known as Khaz'el) is a village in Mahidasht Rural District, Mahidasht District, Kermanshah County, Kermanshah Province, Iran. At the 2006 census, its population was 102, in 25 families.

References 

Populated places in Kermanshah County